Five flats may refer to:
D-flat major, a major musical key with five flats
B-flat minor, a minor musical key with five flats

See also
Flat five (disambiguation)